Ardesi (also Romanized as Ardesī) is a village in Zaz-e Gharbi Rural District, Zaz va Mahru District, Aligudarz County, Lorestan Province, Iran. At the 2006 census, its population was 95, in 21 families.

References 

Towns and villages in Aligudarz County